Jack Ketchums The Girl Next Door (also known as Jack Ketchum's Evil) is a 2007 American horror film directed by Gregory M. Wilson from a screenplay by Daniel Farrands and Philip Nutman. It is based on Jack Ketchum's 1989 novel of the same name, which was inspired by the real-life murder of Sylvia Likens, to whom the movie is dedicated.

Plot
In 2007, a man named David Moran witnesses a man hit and run by a car in New York City. He responds to the situation and tries to resuscitate the victim. That evening, he reflects on his past in the summer of 1958, when he meets his first teenage crush, Meg Loughlin. Meg and her disabled sister Susan have lost their parents in a car accident and are now living with their aunt, Ruth Chandler, and her sons, Willie, Ralphie, and Donny.

Ruth freely allows her sons' young friends, including David, to her house, where she entertains them and offers them beer and cigarettes. Meanwhile, Ruth starves Meg, subjects her to misogynistic lectures, and accuses her of being a whore while her children listen. After an incident when Meg hits Ralphie when he inappropriately touches her, Ruth strips and spanks Susan for being a "conniver," forcing Meg to watch. Ruth then confiscates Meg's ring necklace that had belonged to her mother.

Meg reports the abuse to a local police officer named Officer Jennings, but law enforcement does not criminally charge Ruth. As punishment, Ruth and her sons bind Meg in the basement and torment her, strip her, and then leave her overnight, hanging by the arms from the rafters. She eventually becomes dehydrated and is unable to even eat the dry toast Ruth tries to feed her. Ruth again spanks Susan's bare bottom as punishment for Meg.

With Ruth's approval, the neighborhood children visit the Chandler residence to tie, beat, burn and cut Meg for fun. Ruth cauterizes the wounds Meg receives with cigarettes. David tries to tell his parents but is unable to do so. Officer Jennings checks in once more, answering another call about Meg’s abuse, but Ruth and her sons convince Officer Jennings that they were simply roughhousing. While they are distracted speaking to the officer, David loosens Meg's bindings and tells her to escape that night, even offering to leave money for her in the woods. Meg very nearly escapes but is caught when she comes back for Susan.

David returns to the Chandler house and is guided to the basement, where Meg is being raped by Willie. Donny also wishes to rape Meg, but Ruth refuses because she thinks it would be incest for him to "skinny dip in his brother's scum". Ralphie eventually suggests "cutting" Meg so that she'll be known as a whore. Ruth agrees as she soon carves a sexually explicit message into Meg's abdomen with a heated bobby pin and burns her clitoris with a blowtorch. After that, Ruth and her sons taunt Meg, gloating about how no one can save her since she will die from her wounds escaping from their residence soon. David attempts to leave and get help, but the boys tie him up and kick him in the groin before turning their attention back to Meg.

Later in the day, David awakes still on the basement floor. He frees himself from his bindings and finds Susan sitting with an unconscious Meg. Susan reveals that she had confessed to Meg about Ruth molesting her, making Meg hesitant to escape alone. David plans their escape and lights a fire in the basement. As Ruth enters the basement to douse the fire, David beats her to death with Susan's crutch. Ruth's sons arrive in the basement, and Willie attempts to cut David’s throat with a knife before Officer Jennings intervenes and arrests the Chandler boys. The police take Susan from the basement so that she can testify in court, leaving Meg with David. David returns the ring necklace to Meg, who uses the last of her energy to thank David for what he has done and profess her love for him before finally dying from her injuries (as theorized by Ruth and her sons).

Back in 2007, the adult David reflects on how his past still haunts him. However, as Meg taught him, "It's what you do last that counts."

Cast

Additionally, Mark Margolis portrays the homeless man struck by a vehicle at the beginning of the film and Peter Stickles portrays an EMT. Jack Ketchum, the author of the novel that the film is based on, appears as a carnival worker.

Production
Blythe Auffarth asserted all the scenes in which she is hung up and blindfolded were wearing for her. "It's extremely humiliating and it's a little bit scary being so without control. It's scary being helpless and it's humiliating hanging and dangling there, and it's even more petrifying to have your senses taken away from you," she said.

The film's original score was composed by Ryan Shore.

Reception

On Rotten Tomatoes, it has an approval rating of 67% based on reviews from 15 critics, with an average rating of 6.1/10. Metacritic gives the film a score of 29% based on reviews from 5 critics, indicating "generally unfavorable reviews".

Stephen King said about the film, "The first authentically shocking American film I've seen since Henry: Portrait of a Serial Killer over 20 years ago. If you are easily disturbed, you should not watch this movie. If, on the other hand, you are prepared for a long look into hell, suburban style, The Girl Next Door will not disappoint. This is the dark-side-of-the-moon version of Stand by Me."

See also
 An American Crime: A film which leans more in the direction of a true crime portrayal of Likens's murder. This film was scheduled for release at roughly the same time, but was not released until a Showtime premiere on May 10, 2008.

References

External links
 

2007 films
2007 horror films
2000s crime films
2000s thriller films
American coming-of-age films
American crime thriller films
American psychological horror films
American psychological thriller films
Crime horror films
Films about child abuse
Films about dysfunctional families
Films based on American novels
Films based on horror novels
Films set in New Jersey
Films set in New York City
Films set in 1958
Films set in 2007
Films shot in New Jersey
Films shot in New York City
American independent films
Films about domestic violence
Films about rape
Films about pedophilia 
Crime films based on actual events
Incest in film
Torture in films
Films about child sexual abuse
Films scored by Ryan Shore
Horror films based on actual events
American exploitation films
American splatter films
2000s English-language films
2000s American films